Clarence Remus Wilson was a Rosine, Kentucky farmer who also played the fiddle and five-string banjo. He has been called one of the "greats" of hillbilly music, along with James "Uncle Pen" Vandiver, Kennedy Jones, and Bill Monroe. He also played with Blues musician Arnold Schultz, when Schultz was in town. There is a photo of Schultz and Wilson sitting outside on folding chairs, posing with their instruments, Schultz with his guitar and Wilson with his fiddle.

References

External links
Page with photo of Arnold Schultz (left) and Clarence Wilson (right). Identification in this photo is from the book, In the Country of Country, by Nicholas Dawidoff.
The above link has the commentary. Here's the actual photo.
Bill Monroe biography that tells of Clarence Wilson's strong relationship with the Monroe family, especially James "Uncle Pen" Vandiver.

People from Ohio County, Kentucky
American fiddlers
American banjoists
Folk musicians from Kentucky
Old-time musicians
Year of birth missing
Year of death missing